Kevin Thaw (born 1967 in Uppermill, Saddleworth, West Riding of Yorkshire) is a British rock climber and mountaineer.

Thaw has climbed notable routes and added many first ascents since commencing in Britain’s Peak District then relocating to California and journeying extensively through: Yosemite, El Capitan, Argentine Patagonia, the Himalaya, Alaska, Canadian Rockies, Alps, Mount Everest North side, summit June 2007.

In 2007, he joined the Altitude Everest Expedition 2007, led by renowned American climber and mountaineer, Conrad Anker, retracing the last steps of legendary British climber, George Mallory, on Everest.

Notable ascents
 1997 Continental Drift, El Capitan, Yosemite, CA, USA  FA with Steve Gerberding and Conrad Anker
 2005 Southwest Ridge, Cholatse, Khumbu region, Nepal - summit attained with Conrad Anker, Kris Erickson, John Griber and Abby Watkins on 12 May 2005.

References

External links
 Altitude Everest Expedition 2007
 Kevin Thaw's website

1967 births
Living people
British rock climbers
British mountain climbers
People from Saddleworth
Sportspeople from Yorkshire